Deucravacitinib, sold under the brand name Sotyktu, is  medication used for the treatment of moderate-to-severe plaque psoriasis. It is a tyrosine kinase 2 (TYK2) inhibitor and it is taken by mouth. It was developed by Bristol Myers Squibb.

Deucravacitinib was approved for medical use in the United States in September 2022, and in Australia in December 2022. The US Food and Drug Administration (FDA) considers it to be a first-in-class medication.

Medical uses 
Deucravacitinib is indicated for the treatment of adults with moderate-to-severe plaque psoriasis.

Mechanism of action 
It acts as a highly selective allosteric inhibitor of non-receptor tyrosine-protein kinase 2 (TYK2).

Molecule design 
The chemical structure of deucravacitinib contains a methyl amide in which all three hydrogen atoms are replaced by deuterium.

Society and culture

Legal status 
On 26 January 2023, the Committee for Medicinal Products for Human Use (CHMP) of the European Medicines Agency (EMA) adopted a positive opinion, recommending the granting of a marketing authorization for the medicinal product Sotyktu, intended for the treatment of moderate to severe psoriasis. The applicant for this medicinal product is Bristol-Myers Squibb Pharma EEIG.

References

External links 
 

Bristol Myers Squibb
Deuterated compounds
Non-receptor tyrosine kinase inhibitors
Triazoles
Cyclopropyl compounds
Pyridazines
Methoxy compounds
Carboxamides